The following is a list of 2019 box office number-one films in South Korea. When the number-one film in gross is not the same as the number-one film in admissions, both are listed.

See also
List of South Korean films of 2019

References

2019
South Korea
2019 in South Korean cinema